Lands of Mystery is a 1985 fantasy role-playing game supplement published by Hero Games for Justice, Inc.

Contents
Lands of Mystery describes civilizations of the "lost worlds" genre.

Reception
Allen Varney reviewed Lands of Mystery in Space Gamer No. 76. Varney commented that "There is an undeniable (if fleeting, perhaps) charm in play-acting the roles of those adventurers in Pellucidar or Antarctica. Allston's enthusiasm for the genre is infectious. Its formulized role-motions will almost certainly pale after a few playings, but for those who would like to try a lost-worlds campaign, Lands of Mystery is a valuable sourcebook. A strong, professional effort by all concerned."

Reviews
Different Worlds #41 (Jan./Feb., 1986)

References

Role-playing game books
Role-playing game supplements introduced in 1985